Ouimet is a surname. Notable people with the surname include:

Alphonse Ouimet (1908–1988), Canadian television pioneer and president of the Canadian Broadcasting Corporation (CBC)
David Ouimet, American musician and artist
Francis Ouimet (1893–1967), American amateur golfer
François Ouimet (born 1959), Canadian politician
Gédéon Ouimet (1823–1905), French Canadian politician
Jean Ouimet (born 1954), Québécois politician and the president of Naviga-Cité, a multimedia company
Joseph-Aldric Ouimet (1848–1916), Canadian politician from Quenec
Léo-Ernest Ouimet (1877–1972), Canadian film pioneer
Matt Ouimet, American chief executive

See also
Ouimet Canyon, a gorge in northern Ontario, Canada
Ouimette, a surname